Brian Richard Loyd (born December 3, 1973) is a former professional baseball player and an Olympic bronze medalist in baseball. His minor league baseball career spanned from 1996 to 2003. He was born in Lynwood, California.

References 
 Brian Loyd at Baseball Reference (minors)
 

1973 births
Living people
Baseball players from California
Olympic bronze medalists for the United States in baseball
Portland Sea Dogs players
Portland Beavers players
Tennessee Smokies players
Syracuse SkyChiefs players
Baseball players at the 1996 Summer Olympics
Medalists at the 1996 Summer Olympics